Subash C Gautam FRCS Eng, FACS  is the founder and director of the Advanced Trauma Life Support (ATLS) programme in the United Arab Emirates. He has led the promulgation, development and implementation of the programme from 2004 onwards.

Gautam is also the recipient of the ATLS International Award, for his services to the propagation and development of the ATLS Programme in the Middle East and Africa. He has worked to improve the Emergency and Trauma services by encouraging and aiding in the development of ATLS in India, Pakistan, Nigeria, Lebanon, Syria and Oman.

Being a founder-Member and former President of the Emirates Medical Association (Gastroenterology Division), Gautam is known among the medical community in the UAE.

Early life
He was born in a small village in Panjab, did his early schooling in Banga, New Delhi, Nawashahr and Phagwara. He completed his premedical training from DAV College Jallandar Panjab and later joined Govt Medical College Amritsar.

Medical career
Amritsar medical School was one of the premier institutes in Punjab, India for higher studies.  As such, it had a merit system of enrollment requiring students to compete in an open application process.  Dr. Gautam, during his student days was Secretary and subsequently President of the Central Student Association (Student's Union).

Gautam started Laparoscopic Surgery in April 1992, a first in the Northern Emirates and performed the first Stapling Haemorrhoidectomy and Endoscopic Assisted Thyroidectomy in the United Arab Emirates.  He was awarded Best Original Article award from Emirates Medical Journal and has contributed to national and international journals regularly.

Continuing Medical Education
Gautam has demonstrated his commitment to the CME programmes in the United Arab Emirates over the last thirty years, by organising many of the regions foremost medical and surgical conferences.
 1st UAE Gastroentrology Conference, Dubai 
 1st Trauma Conference, Dubai 
 1st AIDS Conference, Abu Dhabi

Current Positions Held
 Head of Surgery, Fujairah Hospital, UAE
 Clinical Vice Dean and Professor of Surgery, RAK Medical and Health Sciences University, Ras Al Khaimah, UAE
 Associate Professor (Adjunct), Faculty of Medicine and Health Sciences, Al Ain University, UAE
 Chairman, ATLS - Middle East and North Africa
 Founder and Director, ATLS Programme UAE
 International Advisory Board, ATLS Programme India
 Director and Co-ordinator, PHTLS Programme UAE

References

Living people
People from Punjab, India
Indian medical researchers
Year of birth missing (living people)